1 Peter 1 is the first chapter of the First Epistle of Peter in the New Testament of the Christian Bible. The author identifies himself as "Peter, an apostle of Jesus Christ", and the epistle is traditionally attributed to Peter the Apostle, but some writers argue that it is the work of Peter's followers in Rome between the years 70 and 100. After an introductory section, this chapter contains several "general exhortations founded on the blessedness of the Christian state", which continue into chapter 2.

Text
The original text was written in Koine Greek. This chapter is divided into 25 verses.

Textual witnesses
Some early manuscripts containing the text of this chapter are:
In Greek
 Papyrus 72 (3rd/4th century)
 Papyrus 125 (3rd/4th century; extant verses 23–25)
 Codex Vaticanus (325–350)
 Codex Sinaiticus (330–360)
 Codex Alexandrinus (400–440)
 Codex Ephraemi Rescriptus (ca. 450; extant verses 3–25)
 Papyrus 74 (7th century; extant verses 1–2,7–8,13,19–20,25)
In Latin
León palimpsest (7th century; complete)

Old Testament references
1 Peter 1:24–25: Isaiah 40:6–8

Greeting (1:1–2)

Verse 1
Peter, an apostle of Jesus Christ,
To the pilgrims of the Dispersion in Pontus, Galatia, Cappadocia, Asia, and Bithynia,
The specific region named in this verse would cover most of Asia Minor north and west of the Taurus mountains, which was attested in Pliny's letters to Trajan (c. 112 CE) to have a significant number of Christians in towns and countryside of the area.

God's plan of salvation meets believers' every need (1:3–9)
This part contains a form of blessing, which not only praises God, but lays out the main themes of the epistle. Peter follows the pattern of some of Paul's epistles in pouring thanksgiving to God for His blessings, and gives eleven reasons for praising God:
 He is the Father of Lord Jesus Christ (verse 3)
 He has given new birth (cf. ; verse 3)
 the motive for giving the new birth is his mercy (verse 3)
 the result of the mercy is a living hope (verse 3)
 the means to this hope is the resurrection of Jesus (verse 3)
 the object of this hope is an inheritance (verse 4)
 this inheritance cannot be destroyed by hostile elements nor defiled by outside pollution, and cannot fade by wasting from within (verse 4)
 this inheritance is kept in heaven for the believers (verse 4)
 the believers are shielded ("garrisoned") for the inheritance by the power of God (verse 5)
 the means of the shielding is faith (cf. ) to hold on to the promises of God (verse 5)
 the final goal is a salvation to be revealed by God in the last time, when Jesus is revealed (verse 5, 7).

How the salvation was made known to the believers (1:10–12)
The salvation is made known by the work of the Holy Spirit (verse 12), which is the Spirit of Christ (verse 10), who led the prophets to foretell the grace that was to come (verse 10), even to foresee the sufferings of Christ and the glories that would follow (verse 11; cf. ; ; Isaiah 53), but not to find out when and how that would happen.

Redemption into the Christ Group (1:13–21)
The addressees are said to be set apart for God from the surrounding culture, into the holiness.

Verse 16
because it is written, "Be holy, for I am holy".
Citing: ; ;

Rebirth through the Word (1:22–2:3)
Those who have undergone rebirth could be described as 'newborn infants' (1 Peter 2:2), entering the new community of redeemed people of God constituted by the word or the good news of God.

Verses 24–25

For
All flesh is as grass,
and all the glory of man as the flower of grass.
The grass withers, and its flower falls away,
but the word of the Lord endures forever."
This is the word that was preached to you.
Citing: Isaiah 40:6–8.

See also
 Anatolia
 Bithynia
 Cappadocia
 Galatia
 Jesus
 Pontus (region)
 Saint Peter
 Related Bible parts: Leviticus 11, Isaiah 40, Romans 12, Galatians 5

References

Sources

External links
 King James Bible - Wikisource
English Translation with Parallel Latin Vulgate
Online Bible at GospelHall.org (ESV, KJV, Darby, American Standard Version, Bible in Basic English)
Multiple bible versions at Bible Gateway (NKJV, NIV, NRSV etc.)

01